Miki Geva (Hebrew: מיקי גבע;born 29 October 1979) is an Israeli stand-up comedian and actor.

References 

1979 births
Israeli Jews
Israeli male television actors
Jewish Israeli male actors
Israeli stand-up comedians
Israeli male comedians
Living people
People from Kiryat Malakhi